Vaughn Olin Lang (November 10, 1927 – October 2, 2014) was a lieutenant general in the United States Army.

Vaughn O. Lang began his service as second lieutenant at the Officers' Basic Course at Ft. Monmouth, New Jersey in 1952. His subsequent assignments were as the Commander of Bravo Company and then the S3 for the 50th Signal Battalion. He served as the Signal advisor to the Army of the Republic of Vietnam 21st Infantry Division as part of the MACV. His assignments then began to include those which engaged him in materiel acquisition. He served in the Radio-Radar Procurement Branch and in the European Trans-Atlantic Project. Interspersed in these assignments, Lang was chosen to command at every level. He commanded both 447th Signal Battalion in Europe and the 39th Signal Battalion in Vietnam with his unit commands culminating with  the command of the 1st Signal Brigade. He then went on to command the Communications and Electronic Materiel Readiness Command (CERCOM) now part of the United States Army Communications-Electronics Command (CECOM) and the Army Communications Agency. He served as the director of a program devoted to the continuity of our constitutional form of government and to the survival of the Office of the President of the United States.

After retirement he was one of the initial Board of Directors of the 1st Signal Brigade Association and was recognised as a Distinguished Member of the Signal Regiment in a ceremony held December 3, 2008. Distinguished Members of the Regiment are prestigious or notable military or civilian persons who are recognized for their accomplishments.

General Lang died on October 2, 2014, at his home in Vienna, Virginia, aged 86.

References

1927 births
2014 deaths
United States Army personnel of the Vietnam War
People from Blair County, Pennsylvania
Recipients of the Defense Distinguished Service Medal
Recipients of the Defense Superior Service Medal
Recipients of the Legion of Merit
United States Army generals
Military personnel from Pennsylvania